Eileen Lawrence (born 1946) is a Scottish artist.

Eileen Lawrence was born in 1946 and studied at the Edinburgh College of Art (1963-68). Her first solo exhibition was at the 57 Gallery in Edinburgh in 1969.

Her work is in the permanent collection of the Tate Gallery and Ulster Museum.

References

Scottish artists
Alumni of the Edinburgh College of Art
1946 births
Living people
Scottish women artists